Grinspoon is a surname. Notable people with the surname include:

David Grinspoon (born 1959), American astrobiologist
Harold Grinspoon (born 1929), American philanthropist
Lester Grinspoon (1928–2020), American psychiatrist
Peter Grinspoon (born 1966), American physician